Tarskov Mill Farm is a mill and a listed building in Aarhus Municipality, Denmark. The current mill was built in 1777 and was listed in the Danish registry of protected buildings and places by the Danish Heritage Agency on 10 October 1964. The buildings are today used for horse breeding, raising cattle and as a bed and breakfast.

The mill is placed on the Aarhus River north of Jeksendalen. The buildings can be traced bac kto the 1600s but is presumed to be older. The existing water mill was constructed in 1777 for milling grain. The mill no longer operates and the mill house is today empty. The water wheel was replaced by a 25 hk turbine in the 20th century but has since been removed again, leaving only the pond, water locks and grinders. The buildings are half-timbered and the roofs are shingled or thatched.

See also 
 Listed buildings in Aarhus Municipality

External links 

 Tarskov Mill Farm Website

References

Listed buildings and structures in Aarhus Municipality
Timber framed buildings in Aarhus Municipality
Houses completed in 1777